Bob Shoop (born August 18, 1966) is an American football coach and former player who most recently served as defensive coordinator at the University of South Florida. He also served as an off-field defensive analyst for the University of Miami, with previous service as defensive coordinator at Mississippi State, Tennessee, Penn State, and Vanderbilt. Shoop served as the head football coach at Columbia University from 2003 to 2005.

Shoop played for Yale and professionally in the United Kingdom British League in 1988 and 1989.

Playing career
Shoop is a 1988 graduate of Yale University and both played and coached under Carmen Cozza. In his senior year, he was an honorable mention selection to the 1987 All-Ivy League team. 

In 1988, and the early part of 1989, Shoop played professionally in the United Kingdom for the Birmingham Bulls.

Shoop pitched for the Yale Bulldogs baseball team. He earned four varsity letters and twice won the Raymond W. (Ducky) Pond Pitching Award for outstanding pitching.

Coaching career
He served as an assistant coach at Yale and as defensive coordinator from 1994 to 1996.  He was hired by Tom O'Brien at Boston College in 1999.

In 2003, Shoop was hired by Columbia University with the hopes that he would turn around the struggling program.  He was fired shortly after the end of the 2005 with a record of 7–23 in his three seasons with the team.  His 2005 team went winless in the Ivy League and he never finished above 6th place.

From 2007 to 2010, Shoop served as the defensive coordinator at William & Mary.  On January 31, 2011, he was named as the defensive coordinator for the Vanderbilt Commodores, under new head coach James Franklin.  He followed Franklin to Penn State to be in the same capacity for the beginning of the 2014 season.

On January 9, 2016, Shoop was announced as the defensive coordinator for the Tennessee Volunteers.

On December 10, 2017, Shoop was announced as the defensive coordinator for Mississippi State.

On January 20, 2020, Shoop was named the new safeties coach for Michigan.

On January 30, 2021, Shoop was hired by Miami to serve as an off-field defensive analyst.

On December 6, 2021 Shoop was hired by Head Coach Jeff Scott to serve as the University of South Florida defensive coordinator—bringing a much needed veteran presence to the young coaching staff assembled under Scott. Following a 54-28 loss to Temple on November 5, 2022, Scott and Shoop were both relieved of their duties at South Florida.

Personal
Bob's brother, John Shoop, is a former offensive coordinator for Purdue University.

Head coaching record

References

External links
 Mississippi State profile

1966 births
Living people
American football wide receivers
Army Black Knights football coaches
Boston College Eagles football coaches
Columbia Lions football coaches
Miami Hurricanes football coaches
Michigan Wolverines football coaches
Mississippi State Bulldogs football coaches
Northeastern Huskies football coaches
Penn State Nittany Lions football coaches
UMass Minutemen football coaches
Vanderbilt Commodores football coaches
Villanova Wildcats football coaches
Virginia Cavaliers football coaches
William & Mary Tribe football coaches
Tennessee Volunteers football coaches
Yale Bulldogs football coaches
Yale Bulldogs football players
People from Oakmont, Pennsylvania
Coaches of American football from Pennsylvania
Players of American football from Pennsylvania
American expatriate players of American football